Glew is a city in southern Almirante Brown Partido, Buenos Aires Province, Argentina. Its municipal area of  holds a population of 57,878.

The city originated with the purchase of the land in 1857 by Juan Glew, who established an estancia there. He donated land for the extension of the Buenos Aires Great Southern Railway in 1865, and a permanent settlement was founded at the site on August 14 by the name of Pueblo Cambaceres (in honor of Antonio Cambaceres, a distinguished writer and legislator who owned an adjacent lot). 

The Parish of St. Anne was consecrated in 1905. This small church was chosen in 1953 by a frequent summer visitor, painter Raúl Soldi, for the creation of a series of murals, and on his initiative, the Fundación Soldi was established in Glew in 1979 for the promotion of the arts.

Borders 
 North: Town of Longchamps
 East: Town of Ministro Rivadavia
 West: Esteban Echeverria Partido
 South: Presidente Perón Partido

External links

 Municipal website

Almirante Brown Partido
Populated places in Buenos Aires Province
Populated places established in 1865
Cities in Argentina
1865 establishments in Argentina